Magarini Constituency is an electoral constituency in Kilifi County, Kenya. It is one of seven constituencies in the county and was formerly one of two constituencies in the now-defunct Malindi District. The constituency has eight wards, all electing councillors for the Malindi County Council.

Members of Parliament

Wards

References

External links 
Map of the constituency

Constituencies in Kilifi County
Constituencies in Coast Province